Prieto River is a river in the municipality of Ponce, Puerto Rico. It is located in the northeastern area of the municipality. It empties into Río Cerrillos. Together with Río Blanco, Río Prieto is one of the two rivers in Ponce with mouths at the highest elevation (both at ). This river is one of the 14 rivers in the municipality.

Origin
Río Prieto has its origin in barrio Anón in Ponce, in the area of Toro Negro State Forest, half a kilometer southwest of Cerro Jayuya and about 0.75 kilometer southeast of Cerro de Punta. It is a tributary of Río Cerrillos and part of the Río Bucana watershed.

Course
Running south from its origin, Río Prieto runs for about 3 kilometers before it is fed by Rio Blanco. Río Prieto winds its way through the mountains paralleling PR-139 for about 1 kilometer before it feeds into Río Cerrillos approximately 800 feet west of the intersection of PR-139 and Camino Cerrillo in Barrio Anón.

See also

 List of rivers of Puerto Rico
 List of rivers of Ponce

Notes

References

External links
 USGS Hydrologic Unit Map – Caribbean Region (1974)

Rivers of Puerto Rico
Rivers of Ponce, Puerto Rico